Robert Winthrop Ginty (November 14, 1948 – September 21, 2009) was an American actor, producer, screenwriter, and director perhaps best known for playing Thomas Craig Anderson on the television series The Paper Chase.

Early life
Ginty was born in Brooklyn, New York, the son of Elsie M. (née O'Hara), a government worker, and Michael Joseph Ginty, a construction worker. Ginty was involved with music from an early age, playing drums with Jimi Hendrix, Janis Joplin, Carlos Santana and John Lee Hooker. He studied at Yale and trained at the Neighborhood Playhouse and the Actors Studio. Ginty worked in the regional theater circuit, and New York theatre on Broadway. Harold Prince hired him as his assistant after seeing him perform in The New Hampshire Shakespeare Festival Summerstock Company under the direction of Jon Ogden in 1973.

Career

Television
Ginty moved to California in the 1970s, where he found frequent work in various series in the mid-1970s. In 1975, he appeared in the NBC television movie John O'Hara's Gibbsville (also known as The Turning Point of Jim Malloy). In 1976, he attained some popularity after finding a steady role starring with Robert Conrad in Baa Baa Black Sheep, a successful television series about the experiences of United States Marine Corps aviator Pappy Boyington and his squadron of misfits during World War II. Ginty played pilot T.J. Wiley. He also appeared in one episode of The Father Dowling Mysteries (Season 3 Episode 8) as shady bookstore owner Lenny Rothstein.

He had guest appearances in the first couple of seasons on Simon & Simon, as A.J. and Rick's medical examiner friend on the police force. He then went on to co-star in four television series: The Paper Chase (1978) (where he met future wife Francine Tacker), Falcon Crest, CHiPs and Hawaiian Heat. He also appeared in John Llewellyn Moxey's The Courage and the Passion. He was also on an episode of Matlock (The Narc).

Film
Ginty had a small role as a popcorn vendor in Two-Minute Warning (1976), and then appeared in two Hal Ashby movies—the 1976 Bound for Glory, a biography of folk singer Woody Guthrie, starring David Carradine, and Coming Home (1978) starring Jane Fonda, Jon Voight, and Bruce Dern (a film which was nominated for eight Oscars).

Around the time he appeared in the series The Paper Chase (1978), he won his first film action lead in The Exterminator (1980), which became a surprising box-office hit. Four years later, he reprised the action lead in the sequel Exterminator 2. After starring in Exterminator, Ginty had the lead in many action movies including:
Warrior of the Lost World (1983), shot in Italy, is a memorable example of a failed post-apocalyptic/Mad Max-like movie. Seen on Mystery Science Theater 3000.
Gold Raiders (1983), a jungle movie shot in Thailand.
Vivre pour survivre (White Fire) (1985), shot in Istanbul.
The Retaliator (1987), aka Programmed to Kill, a Cyborg action film with a young Paul Walker in one of his first screen appearances. 
Out On Bail (1989), a UK action-thriller, shot in South Africa.

Ginty's acting career faded in the 1990s, although he played some higher-quality roles, such as in Tom Ropelewski's comedy Madhouse. Ginty also performed in another big production, with Mickey Rourke and Don Johnson, in Harley Davidson and the Marlboro Man.

Directing
He became an independent producer/director, and formed his own production company, Ginty Films, buying shares in the special effects studio Introvision which distributed his vehicles both in the United States and abroad. Most were made on very limited budgets, but he had nevertheless done quite well for himself as a writer/producer/director, especially overseas, with such assembly-line fare as Gold Raiders (1983) which was filmed in Thailand, Cop Target (1990) which was shot in France, and Woman of Desire (1993). Ginty continued in the late 1990s, performing, producing, and directing on such shows as China Beach (1988), Xena: Warrior Princess (1995), Nash Bridges (1996), Charmed (1998) and Tracker (2001).

Personal life
Ginty resided, variously, in Los Angeles, Dublin, Toronto, and Vancouver. He was married to actress and former co-star Francine Tacker; they had a son, actor James Francis Ginty. Ginty had also been married to actress Lorna Patterson. Both Tacker and Patterson would work together in the short-lived situation comedy Goodtime Girls. He was married to his third wife Michelle Craske at the time of his death (due to cancer), in Los Angeles, California.

He began working with Narconon, a Scientology organization which provides drug rehabilitation, drug education and drug prevention programs, in 1979.

References

External links

 Robert Ginty papers, 1969-1997, held by the Billy Rose Theatre Division, New York Public Library for the Performing Arts
Ginty's obituary in Variety
Nanarland, French website which hosts several reviews on Robert Ginty's movies

1948 births
2009 deaths
Male actors from New York City
American male film actors
American male television actors
American television directors
Deaths from cancer in California
People from Brooklyn
Male actors from Los Angeles
Yale School of Drama alumni
Film directors from California
Film directors from New York City
20th-century American male actors